Penguin Problems is a 2016 Children's picture book by Jory John and illustrated by Lane Smith. It is about a penguin that complains about his situation. They would later follow that up with Giraffe Problems (2018) and Cat Problems (2021).

Reception
A starred review in Kirkus Reviews of Penguin Problems called it "Well-paced, bursting with humor, and charmingly misanthropic." School Library Journal stated, "This sublime pairing of author and artist results in a rib-tickling exploration of what it means to look at the unsunny side."

Penguin Problems has also been reviewed by Publishers Weekly, Booklist, The Horn Book Magazine, The New York Times, and Common Sense Media.

It is a 2017 Bank Street College of Education Best Children's Book of the Year, and a 2016 The Irish Times Best Children's Book of the Year.

References

External links
Library holdings of Penguin Problems

2016 children's books
American picture books
Books about penguins